Naphtali Herz Shulman (died ) was a Russian Hebrew author.

Biography
Shulman was born in Bikhov, Mogilev Governorate, and later settled in Vilna, where he earned a livelihood from giving private lessons in wealthy homes.

He edited Benjamin Musaphia's Zekher rav (Shklov, 1797), with an index of the words to be found in the Bible, a translation of them into Yiddish, and grammatical notes. He also composed and published Shir ve-hallel (in Hebrew, Russian, and German; Vilna, 1806), a hymn sung by the Jews of Vilna on the birthday of the grand duchess Elizabeth Alexandrowna, daughter of Alexander I and Elizabeth Alexeievna.

References
 

19th-century Jews
Hebrew-language writers
Hebrew-language poets
Jewish writers from the Russian Empire
People from Mogilev Governorate